The IBM Big Blue are an American football team located in the Tsukuba, Ibaraki.  They are a member of the X-League.

Team history
1976 Team founded as the IBM Thinkers.
1977 Joined the X-League.
1989 Team name changed to IBM Big Blue.
1996 Won X2 Central Divisional title. Defeated Penta-Ocean Construction Co. 28-27 in X2-X1 replacement game.
1997 Promoted from X2 to X1.
2010 Advanced to Final stage. Lost to Panasonic Impulse 28-31.
2014 Defeated the Lixil Deers in the Final stage to advance to the Japan X Bowl. Lost to the Fujitsu Frontiers 10-44. 
2016 Celebrated 40th anniversary of team founding.

Seasons
{| class="wikitable"
|bgcolor="#FFCCCC"|X-League Champions (1987–present)
|bgcolor="#DDFFDD"|<small>Division Champions</small>
|bgcolor="#D0E7FF"|Final Stage/Semifinals Berth
|bgcolor="#96CDCD"|Wild Card /2nd Stage Berth
|}

Current import playersFormer Import Players'''

See also
IBM Big Blue (rugby union)

References

External links
  (Japanese)

American football in Japan
Tsukuba, Ibaraki
1976 establishments in Japan
American football teams established in 1976
Sports teams in Ibaraki Prefecture
X-League teams